Orient-Macksburg High School is a rural public high school located in Orient, Iowa, United States, part of the Orient-Macksburg Community School District. Their mascot is the Adair Bulldog.

Athletics
The Bulldogs compete in the Bluegrass Conference
The students from Orient-Macksburg also play on combined teams with Creston as Creston-Orient-Macksburg in the Hawkeye 10 Conference in several sports.

Volleyball 
Football (as Creston-Orient-Macksburg)
Cross-Country (boys and girls)
Basketball (boys and girls)
Bowling (boys and girls, as Creston-Orient-Macksburg)
Wrestling (as Creston-Orient-Macksburg)
 2007 Class 2A State Champions
Track and Field (boys and girls, as Creston-Orient-Macksburg)
Golf (boys and girls, as Creston-Orient-Macksburg)
 Boys' - 2013 Class 3A State Champions
Soccer (boys and girls, as Creston-Orient-Macksburg)
Baseball 
Softball

See also
List of high schools in Iowa

External links

References

Public high schools in Iowa
Schools in Adair County, Iowa